Urgleptes guadeloupensis is a species of beetle in the family Cerambycidae. It was described by Fleutiaux and Sallé in 1889.

References

Urgleptes
Beetles described in 1889